Nahshon is an urban warfare-trained infantry battalion in the Israel Defense Forces tasked with patrolling the area of Nablus in the West Bank.

History
The battalion motto is "Be first, Nahshon," referring to the Prince of Judah, Nahshon. It is a part of the Kfir Brigade.

Nahshon began as a company in November 1998 and was reformed as a battalion in 1999–2000.  Its founding commander was Lt. Col. Yoram Loredo. During the Second Intifada it lost six men, including four officers. It is one of six other such battalions who since the 1990s have commanded separate sections of territory in the West Bank to prevent suicide bombings and maintain order. The current commander is Lt. Col. Tamir Shalom.

References

Battalions of Israel
Military units and formations established in 1999
1999 establishments in Israel